The 1983–84 Northern Premier League season was the 16th in the history of the Northern Premier League, a football competition in England.

Overview
The League featured twenty-two clubs.

Team changes
The following four clubs left the League at the end of the previous season:
Gateshead promoted to Alliance Premier League
King's Lynn transferred to Southern League Premier Division
Tamworth relegated to Southern League Midland Division
Netherfield relegated to North West Counties League Division One

The following four clubs joined the League at the start of the season:
Barrow relegated from Alliance Premier League
Stafford Rangers relegated from Alliance Premier League
Horwich RMI promoted from North West Counties League Division One
Rhyl promoted from North West Counties League Division One

League table

Results

Cup Results
Challenge Cup:

South Liverpool 1–1 (7–6 Pens) Hyde United

President's Cup:

Workington bt. Marine

Northern Premier League Shield: Between Champions of NPL Premier Division and Winners of the NPL Cup.

Barrow bt. South Liverpool

End of the season
At the end of the sixteenth season of the Northern Premier League, Barrow applied to join the Alliance Premier League and were successful.

Promotion and relegation
The following club left the League at the end of the season:
Barrow promoted to Alliance Premier League

The following club joined the League the following season:
Bangor City relegated from Alliance Premier League

External links
 Northern Premier League Tables at RSSSF

Northern Premier League seasons
6